Kishorpura is a patwar circle and village in ILRC Nimera in Phagi Tehsil in Jaipur district, Rajasthan. Kishorpura is also a patwar circle for nearby villages, Beer Ramchandrapura, Bimalpura, Mohanpura Rajawatan, Ramchandrapura and Lakhawas.

In Kishorpura, there are 110 households with total population of 806 (with 50.74% males and 49.26% females), based on 2011 census. Total area of village is 2.92 km2.  There is one primary school and one post office in Kishorpura village.

References 

Villages in Jaipur district